James Parker Jr. (March 3, 1776 – April 1, 1868) was a United States representative from New Jersey. He served as the Collector of the Port of New Jersey in Perth Amboy from 1829 to 1833. He was Mayor of Perth Amboy, New Jersey.

Early life
Parker was born at "Shipley", his father's farm in Bethlehem in the Province of New Jersey on March 3, 1776 to James Parker Sr. (1725–1797) and Gertrude MacGregor (née Skinner) Parker (1739–1811).  His father was on the provincial council before the Revolution, an active member of the board of proprietors of the colony, and the owner of large landed properties.

Through his father, Parker's great-grandfather was James Parker, a prominent colonial American printer and publisher.  His maternal grandparents were the Rev. William Skinner (the Rector of St. Peter's Church in Perth Amboy) and Elizabeth (née Van Cortlandt) Skinner (the daughter of Stephanus Van Cortlandt, the first native born mayor of New York).  His uncle was Brig. Gen. Cortlandt Skinner, the last Royal Attorney General of New Jersey and a Loyalist with the New Jersey Volunteers, also known as Skinner's Greens, during the Revolutionary War.

Career
Parker moved to Perth Amboy after the Revolution.  He graduated from Columbia College of Columbia University in New York City in 1793, and then became a merchant in Manhattan, New York City, but on the death of his father returned to Perth Amboy.

Parker engaged in the management and settlement of properties left by his father.  He was also a land surveyor and as a lawyer, although he was never admitted to the bar.  He was a member of the New Jersey General Assembly from 1806 to 1810 and in 1812–1813, 1815–1816, 1818, and 1827.  During his legislative career, he originated the law that put an end to the local slave trade in 1819, the one that established the school fund, and the provisions of a law that regulated the partition of real estate in New Jersey and the rights of aliens to possess it.  He was Mayor of Perth Amboy, New Jersey in 1815 and again in 1850.  He was Collector of the Port of New Jersey in Perth Amboy from 1829 to 1833.

Parker was elected as a Jacksonian to the 23rd and 24th Congresses, holding office from March 4, 1833 to March 3, 1837.

After leaving Congress he resumed his former activities, and was registrar of the board of proprietors of East Jersey. He was a member of the different boundary commissions to obtain a settlement of the boundary question between the States of New York and New Jersey, and was a delegate to the New Jersey constitutional convention in 1844.

He was a vice president of the New Jersey Historical Society for many years, its president from 1864 until his death, was active in the cause of education, and gave the land to Rutgers College on which its buildings now stand.

Personal life
On January 5, 1803, Parker was married to Penelope Coats Butler (1788–1823), the daughter of Anthony Butler and Elizabeth (née Coates) Butler. Together, they were the parents of:

 James Parker (1804–1805), who died young.
 James Parker (1805–1861), who married Anna Forbes.
 William Parker (1807–1868), who married Lucy Cushing Whitwell (1811–1909) in 1836. William was one of the earliest railroad builders and was associated with the building of the Boston & Worcester Railroad.
 Margaret Elizabeth Parker (1809–1886), who married William Adee Whitehead (1810–1884), a historian who assisted in the development of Key West.
 Gertrude Parker (1811–1828), who died aged 16.
 Penelope Parker (1813–1817), who died young.
 Sarah Coats Levy Parker (1816–1842), who died unmarried.
 John Cortlandt Parker (1818–1907), who married Elizabeth Wolcott Stites (1827–1907), the daughter of Richard Wayne Stites, in 1847.
 Penelope Butler Parker (1821–1856), who married Edward Dunham (1819–1892) in 1855.

After his first wife's death in 1823, Parker remarried to Catherine Morris Ogden on September 20, 1827.  Catherine was the daughter of Euphemia (née Morris) Ogden and Samuel Ogden, the founder of Boonton Iron Works. Through her father she was a niece of Abraham Ogden and through her mother, she was a niece of Gouverneur Morris, a U.S. Senator and U.S. Minister to France.

Parker died in Perth Amboy, New Jersey on April 1, 1868. He was buried in St. Peter's Episcopal Churchyard.

Descendants
Through his son Cortlandt, he was the grandfather of James Parker (a major general in the United States Army and a Medal of Honor recipient for his role in the Philippine–American War during 1899), Richard Wayne Parker (also a United States Representative from New Jersey).

References

External links
 
 

1776 births
1868 deaths
American surveyors
Columbia College (New York) alumni
Mayors of Perth Amboy, New Jersey
Members of the New Jersey General Assembly
People from Bethlehem Township, New Jersey
Jacksonian members of the United States House of Representatives from New Jersey
19th-century American politicians
People of colonial New Jersey
Burials in New Jersey